Derek Anthony Klena (born October 3, 1991) is an American actor and singer. He is best known for his work on Broadway, including originating the roles of Nick Healy in Jagged Little Pill (2019–2021), Dmitry in Anastasia (2017–2018), and Michael in The Bridges of Madison County (2014). His breakthrough was in the original Off-Broadway production of Pasek & Paul's stage adaptation of Dogfight, and he played Fiyero in the 10th anniversary company of Wicked on Broadway. He has made appearances on several television series such as Unbreakable Kimmy Schmidt, The Code, and Pretty Little Liars: Original Sin.

In 2020, Klena was nominated for a Tony Award for Best Featured Actor in a Musical for his portrayal of Nick Healy in Jagged Little Pill.

Life and career
Klena was born in San Dimas, California. He grew up with his two younger siblings in West Covina, California, outside of Los Angeles, where he attended South Hills High School. His brother, Dillon, is also an actor.

He attended the University of California, Los Angeles where he initially studied theater but switched his major to psychology. His freshman year he  played baseball before seriously pursuing acting and auditioning. From 2009 to 2011, he took part in regional Southern California theater. He participated in American Idol's ninth season. Around 2010, Klena was invited to audition as a standby for Aaron Tveit in the Broadway musical Catch Me If You Can after show producer Marc Shaiman contacted Klena regarding a cover he did of its song "Goodbye" at a Los Angeles cabaret show. He did not get cast but was subsequently invited to audition for the workshop of Carrie. He took a leave of absence at UCLA in his junior year to take part in the 2012 Off-Broadway revival of Carrie.

He originated the role of Eddie Birdlace in the stage adaptation of Dogfight. In 2013, he played Fiyero in the 10th anniversary company of Wicked on Broadway. Subsequently, he played son Michael Johnson in the original Broadway musical The Bridges of Madison County.

In 2014, he was cast in the pre-Broadway musical adaption of the 1982 film Diner at the Signature Theatre in Virginia. Adapted by original screenwriter Barry Levinson and with music by Sheryl Crow, the musical originally planned to open on Broadway but did not transfer. In 2016, he was cast to star as Dmitry in the original production of Anastasia, the stage musical adaption of the animated film of the same name. Premiering in Hartford, Connecticut in March 2016, it opened on Broadway in April 2017. After a year with the production, he left to take part in the original Cambridge, Massachusetts production of Jagged Little Pill, a musical based on the music of Alanis Morissette. The Broadway production opened in December 2019. Klena was nominated for a Tony Award for Best Featured Actor in a Musical for his portrayal of Nick Healy. The show went on hiatus in March 2020 and reopened in October 2021 but closed a few months later due to the Omicron surge in New York City. In May 2022, he replaced Aaron Tveit as Christian in Moulin Rouge! on Broadway. 

He resides in New York City. Klena married his longtime girlfriend Elycia Scriven in 2018. In April 2022, Klena and his wife announced that they were expecting their first child. The couple welcomed a son, Dax Arthur Klena, on September 8th, 2022.

Stage credits
Selected credits

Filmography

Television

Awards and nominations

References

External links

Derek Klena at the Internet Off-Broadway Database
Derek Klena at About the Artists

1991 births
21st-century American male actors
American male musical theatre actors
American male stage actors
American male television actors
American male singers
Living people
University of California, Los Angeles alumni
People from San Dimas, California
Actors from California